Tyler Dominic Boyd (born December 30, 1994) is a professional soccer player who plays as a winger for Major League Soccer club LA Galaxy. Born in New Zealand, he represents the United States national team.

Personal life
Boyd is a citizen of both New Zealand and the United States, having been born in New Zealand to a New Zealand father and an American mother. He was raised in Santa Ynez, California, until the age of 10, when he returned to New Zealand. He credits the UC Santa Barbara Gauchos men's soccer team as his inspiration for starting the game as he served as a ball boy and they held camps near his hometown.

Club career

New Zealand clubs
After coming through the youth teams, Boyd first appeared for the senior team of Melville United in the NRFL Premier during the 2011 season at the age of 16, helping them to a third-placed finish. Showing promise, Boyd joined Waikato FC in the ASB Premiership for the 2011–12 season.

Wellington Phoenix
In September 2012, Boyd signed a three-year contract for the Wellington Phoenix and made his debut as a 17-year-old, coming on as a substitute in an A-League match against Sydney FC on October 6, 2012. Boyd scored 2 goals in 20 appearances for the Phoenix in the 2013–14 season and was named the club's under-23 player of the year.

Vitória de Guimarães
On February 24, 2015, Boyd signed a four-year deal with top Portuguese side Vitória de Guimarães to begin at the conclusion of the 2014–15 A-League season.

Loan to Tondela
On June 29, 2017, Boyd joined Tondela on loan, joining fellow former A-League player Nick Ansell.

Loan to MKE Ankaragücü
On January 31, 2019, Boyd joined Turkish Süper Lig side MKE Ankaragücü on loan until the end of the season.

Beşiktaş
On July 15, 2019, Boyd joined Turkish Süper Lig side Beşiktaş, signing a 4-year contract. On November 7, 2019, Boyd scored his first goal for the club in a 3-1 defeat to Sporting Braga in the group stage of the UEFA Europa League.

On September 13, 2020, Boyd scored a spectacular long-range effort in a 3–1 win over Trabzonspor. On October 7, Boyd was not included as one of the club's 14 foreign roster spots for the first half of the Süper Lig season. This happened despite the player having started all six of the club's games that season.

Loan to Sivasspor
On February 1, 2021, Boyd was loaned out to fellow Turkish Süper Lig club Sivasspor until the end of the season.

LA Galaxy
After a preseason trial, Boyd signed a one year contract with American MLS club LA Galaxy on February 20, 2023.

International career

New Zealand 
Boyd represented New Zealand at the 2013 OFC U-20 Championship in Fiji. He played in all three group matches at the 2013 FIFA U-20 World Cup in Turkey.

Boyd made his senior debut for New Zealand on 5 March 2014 with fellow debutant and former Melville United teammate Ryan Thomas in a friendly against Japan in Tokyo.

United States 
On May 18, 2019, having solely appeared in friendly matches for New Zealand, FIFA approved a one-time switch for Boyd to represent the United States internationally. Just days later, on 22 May, he was named in the United States' provisional roster for the 2019 CONCACAF Gold Cup.

Boyd made his senior debut for the United States on June 9, 2019, in a friendly against Venezuela in Cincinnati, Ohio.

In his second game for the United States, Boyd scored his first goal for his new country, scoring in their Gold Cup game against Guyana on June 18, 2019. The goal was the 1,000th goal in United States men's national soccer team history and was assisted by midfielder Michael Bradley. In the 80th minute, Boyd doubled his goalscoring total with his second of the game.

Career statistics

Club

International

As of matches played June 30, 2019. United States score listed first, score column indicates score after each Boyd goal.

See also
 List of association footballers who have been capped for two senior national teams 
 List of foreign Primeira Liga players
 List of Wellington Phoenix FC players

References

External links 
 
 

Living people
1994 births
A-League Men players
American people of New Zealand descent
American soccer players
Association football forwards
New Zealand association footballers
New Zealand Football Championship players
New Zealand international footballers
Primeira Liga players
Liga Portugal 2 players
Major League Soccer players
Süper Lig players
Wellington Phoenix FC players
Waikato FC players
Vitória S.C. players
C.D. Tondela players
MKE Ankaragücü footballers
Beşiktaş J.K. footballers
Sivasspor footballers
LA Galaxy players
New Zealand people of American descent
United States men's international soccer players
Dual internationalists (football)
2019 CONCACAF Gold Cup players
Soccer players from California
Sportspeople from Tauranga
Sportspeople from Santa Barbara County, California